Stanisław Jasiński (born 13 November 1959) is a Polish equestrian. He competed in two events at the 1980 Summer Olympics.

References

1959 births
Living people
Polish male equestrians
Olympic equestrians of Poland
Equestrians at the 1980 Summer Olympics
People from Masovian Voivodeship